Estíbaliz "Esti" Gabilondo Cuéllar (born 16 November 1976 in San Sebastián) is a Spanish actress and journalist. She is niece of the former Minister of Education Ángel Gabilondo, and the journalist Iñaki Gabilondo.

She studied Audiovisual Communication at the University of Navarre and drama at the Laboratorio de Teatro William Layton. After several works as an actress, she became a reporter for the program Caiga quien caiga in 2008.

Filmography
 Mano a mano, by Ignacio Tatay. (2007)
 Estrellas que alcanzar, by Mikel Rueda. (2009)
 Casual Day, by Max Lemcke. (2007)
 Traumalogía, by Daniel Sánchez Arévalo (2007)
 Locos por el sexo, by Javier Rebollo (2006)
 El Calentito, by Chus Gutiérrez (2005)
 Slam, by Miguel Martí (2003)

Television 
 Alfonso, el príncipe maldito, Telecinco, (2010)
 Estados Alterados Maitena, La Sexta, (2009)
 Malas Compañías, La Sexta (2009)
 Caiga quien caiga, laSexta, Cuatro (2008)
 Amar en tiempos revueltos, La 1 (2007–2008)
 A tortas con la vida, Antena 3 (2005)
 Paco y Veva, TVE-1 (2004).
 Hospital Central, Telecinco.
 Policías, Antena 3.
 Esto no es serio, ETB
 Kilker Dema, ETB

References

External links
 
  www.mesalafilms.com

1976 births
Living people
Actresses from the Basque Country (autonomous community)
People from San Sebastián
Spanish film actresses
Spanish television actresses
21st-century Spanish actresses
University of Navarra alumni
Basque-language actors